A group of metabolites derived from thyroxine and triiodothyronine via the peripheral enzymatic removal of iodines from the thyroxine nucleus. Thyronine is the thyroxine nucleus devoid of its four iodine atoms.

References

Amino acids